The 2014 Campeonato Internacional de Tênis de Campinas was a professional tennis tournament played on clay courts. It was the fourth edition of the tournament which was part of the 2014 ATP Challenger Tour. It took place in Campinas, Brazil between 15 and 21 September 2014.

Singles main-draw entrants

Seeds

 1 Rankings are as of September 8, 2014.

Other entrants
The following players received wildcards into the singles main draw:
  Fabrício Neis
  Ghilherme Scarpelli
  Leonardo Telles
  Marcelo Zormann

The following players received entry from the qualifying draw:
  Nicolas Santos 
  João Pedro Sorgi
  Ricardo Hocevar 
  Caio Zampieri

Champions

Singles

 Diego Schwartzman def.  André Ghem, 4–6, 6–4, 7–5

Doubles

 Facundo Bagnis /  Diego Schwartzman def.  André Ghem /  Fabrício Neis, 7–6(7–4), 5–7, [10–7]

External links
Official Website

Tetra Pak Tennis Cup
2014 Tetra Pak Tennis Cup